Ardheisker is a settlement on North Uist, in the Outer Hebrides, Scotland. Ardheisker is within the parish of North Uist, and the A865 runs through the settlement.

References

External links

Canmore - North Uist, Ardheisker site record

Villages on North Uist